Djahid Berrahal (born 24 January 1994) is an Algerian freestyle wrestler. He competed at the 2020 Summer Olympics in the men's 125 kg class.

References

External links
 
 
 

1994 births
Living people
Algerian male sport wrestlers
Olympic wrestlers of Algeria
Wrestlers at the 2020 Summer Olympics
21st-century Algerian people
20th-century Algerian people